Adel Hassan Al A'ali (born in 1957) is a Bahraini businessman. In 2018, he was appointed chair of the construction firm Haji Hassan Group.

Early life and education
He obtained a Bachelor of Business Administration degree from Aston University in Birmingham, United Kingdom, in 1981. He graduated from the Executive Education program at the Stanford Graduate School of Business in 1998.

Career
He is a member of the boards of directors of the following companies:
 Hajj Hassan Group (Chair and CEO)
 Ibn Al-Nafees Hospital (Chair)
 Dar Al-Wasat Company for Publishing and Distribution
 Bahrain Chamber of Commerce and Industry (two consecutive terms)
 Al-Ahlia Insurance Company (Vice-Chair)
 United Insurance Company
 United Cement Company
 Bahrain Precast Concrete Company
 Bahrain Businessmen's Association (2001)
 Supreme Council for Vocational Training
He worked extensively in economic research projects on subjects such as vocational training and management systems (including computerization) in the contracting sector.

2011 protests
In 2011, in the wake of the Bahraini uprising of 2011, the Bahrain Mirror site stated that the Executive Director of the Chamber of Commerce, Ebrahim Langawi, forged a resignation letter from Al A’ali. An internal investigation committee headed by Dr. Taqi Al Zeera confirmed the forgery was for purely sectarian reasons, and Al A’ali's membership was reinstated.

References

1957 births
Living people
Alumni of Aston University
Bahraini businesspeople
Bahraini Shia Muslims
People from Eastern Province, Saudi Arabia